Foreign devil is a discriminatory and racist term in Hong Kong for a foreigner.

Foreign Devil or Foreign Devils may refer to:

Books
Foreign Devil (Harris novel) novel by Christine Harris 1999 
"Foreign Devils", short story by W. Somerset Maugham in Asia magazine, February 1922 
Foreign Devils, poetry by D. J. Enright  1972
Foreign Devils, novel by Irvin Faust 1973
Foreign Devils (novella) by Andrew Cartmel 2003  
Foreign Devils, book on Hollywood by Gábor Gergely 2012
Foreign Devils, novel by John Hornor Jacobs  2015
One Foreign Devil, by Lawrence Earl 1962
A Foreign Devil in China, the story of Dr. L. Nelson Bell, an American surgeon in China by John Pollock (author) 1971 
Foreign Devil: Thirty years of reporting from the Far East, by Richard Hughes 1972
Foreign Devils in the Flowery Kingdom, by Carl Crow 1940
Foreign Devils on the Silk Road , book on the search for the lost cities and treasures of Chinese Central Asia by Peter Hopkirk	 1980

Film and TV
Foreign Devils (1927 film) 1927 film